Holiday Wishes may refer to:

Holiday Wishes, novel by Nora Roberts
Holiday Wishes, DVD by Amber Benson
Holiday Wishes (Idina Menzel album), album by Idina Menzel, 2014
Holiday Wishes: From Me to You, album by Jon B, 2006